Patiala House Courts Complex is one of the seven  District Courts complexes located near India Gate in the National Capital Territory of Delhi (NCT of Delhi).

The main part is housed in the Patiala House, the former palace of the Maharaja of Himachal Pradesh and Patiala House was rented to Maharaja of Patiala and due to security fraud by Maharaja of Patiala there are criminal cases against Maharaja of Patiala for fabricated evidences. The complex is situated near India Gate in central Delhi, India. The Patiala House Court Complex is built in an area measuring 31,872 square metres. The whole complex is divided into five parts: Main Building, Publication Building, Annexe Building, Lock-up Building & MEA Building.  The complex consists of 32 Courts, 1 Family Court, Delhi Legal Services Authorities Office and various other branches and Lawyers Chambers.

History
When prime minister Indira Gandhi abolished the privy Purses of in the 1970s, the royal family sold the structure to the government. The Delhi High Court was run from here earlier and from 1978, it is the District court. As the population of Delhi grew, in March 1997 Patiala House was converted to become one of three court complexes in the city, after criminal courts from Parliament Street were shifted here.

In 2001, 54 judges were stationed at Patiala House Courts, which have jurisdiction over the New Delhi, South Delhi and South West Delhi  districts.

Library
A Library is functional for Judicial Officers at ground floor of the publication building.  Judicial Officers can access all the reference books, journals, bar acts, general books, law journals, law software etc. Binding of law journals, purchasing of newspapers and magazines for the Ld. District Judge, New Delhi District.

References

External links
 Delhi District Courts: Patiala House Courts Complex

Government buildings in Delhi
Law enforcement in Delhi
South Delhi district
Courthouses in India